DMG-PEG 2000 is a synthetic lipid formed by the PEGylation of myristoyl diglyceride. It is used to manufacture lipid nanoparticles that are used in mRNA vaccines, and in particular forms part forms part of the drug delivery system for the Moderna COVID-19 vaccine.

See Also
Moderna COVID-19 vaccine nanoparticle ingredients
Distearoylphosphatidylcholine
SM-102
Cholesterol

References 

Excipients
Polyethers
Polymers